The 1991 Richmond Spiders football team was an American football team that represented the University of Richmond as a member of the Yankee Conference during the 1991 NCAA Division I-AA football season. In their third season under head coach Jim Marshall, Richmond compiled a 2–9 record, with a mark of 2–6 in conference play, finishing tied for seventh place in the Yankee.

Schedule

References

Richmond
Richmond Spiders football seasons
Richmond Spiders